Abdisho III bar Moqli was Patriarch of the Church of the East from 1139 to 1148.

Sources 

Abdisho's patriarchate 
The following account of Abdisho's patriarchate is given by Bar Hebraeus:

Bar Sawma was succeeded by Abdisho Bar Moqli, of Mosul, an old man of a fine appearance.  He was summoned to the caliph's palace after the election, and after he was crowned with the mitre and seated upon a mule, he progressed as far as the church of the third ward with one of the noblemen of the palace, and there dismounted.  He conducted his patriarchate ably for nine years, and was then struck down by an apoplexy.  He was consecrated on a Sunday, the tenth day of the latter teshrin [November] in the year 533 of the Arabs [AD 1139], and died on the third day of the latter teshrin in the year 541 of the same era [AD 1147].

A charter of protection granted to Abdisho III in 1139 by the caliph al-Muqtafi was published in 1926 by the Assyrian scholar Alphonse Mingana. In 1142 Abdisho was able to reconcile with the Syriac Orthodox Church Maphrian Dionysius, increasing the unity within Syriac Christianity.

See also
 List of patriarchs of the Church of the East

References

Citations

Bibliography
 Abbeloos, J. B., and Lamy, T. J., Bar Hebraeus, Chronicon Ecclesiasticum (3 vols, Paris, 1877)
 Assemani, J. A., De Catholicis seu Patriarchis Chaldaeorum et Nestorianorum (Rome, 1775)
 
 Brooks, E. W., Eliae Metropolitae Nisibeni Opus Chronologicum (Rome, 1910)
 Gismondi, H., Maris, Amri, et Salibae: De Patriarchis Nestorianorum Commentaria I: Amri et Salibae Textus (Rome, 1896)
 Gismondi, H., Maris, Amri, et Salibae: De Patriarchis Nestorianorum Commentaria II: Maris textus arabicus et versio Latina (Rome, 1899)

Patriarchs of the Church of the East
12th-century bishops of the Church of the East
Nestorians in the Abbasid Caliphate
1148 deaths